Agnia (Agne) Olegovna Ditkovskyte, after marriage — Chadova, born 11 May 1988, Vilnius, Lithuanian SSR) is a Russian actress of a Lithuanian origin.

Biography 
Ditkovskyte was born into the family of Lithuanian director  and Russian actress Tatyana Lyutaeva. She lived in Lithuania until the age of 15, then in 2004 she moved to Moscow with her mother and younger brother Dominique.

Ditkovskyte decided to follow in her parents' footsteps and enrolled at VGIK. However, she only spent a single year at university. Despite this, Ditkovskyte was able to start a professional career and debuted in feature film  Heat, in which she played a major role.

In 2006, Ditkovskyte stopped acting for a while, but in 2008 she again started appearing on the screen and continues to pursue an acting career to this day.

Personal life 
From 2006 to 2009, Ditkovskyte dated Russian actor, Aleksey Chadov, whom she met on the set of the film Heat, after which their relationship began.

Ditkovskyte and Chadov both acted in the film Love in the Big City. Initially their relationship was happy, but later began to disintegrate and Ditkovskyte initiated their separation.

Later it became known that  they had decided to resume their relationship. On August 24, 2012, they got married. On June 5, 2014, Ditkovskyte gave birth to their son Fedor. On May 2, 2015 the actors broke up again.

Filmography
2006 —  Heat
 2006 —  Ivan Podushkin. Gentleman Detective
 2006 —  Death Bequest
 2008 —  Mountaineer
 2009 —  Hooked on the Game
 2010 —  
 2011 —  Boris Godunov
 2011 —  Tadas Blinda (The Beginning)
 2012 —  
 2013 —  
 2013 —  A Toy Seller
 2014 —  Viy
 2014 —  
 2017 —  Dance to Death
 2021 —

References

External links
 
  

1988 births
Living people
21st-century Lithuanian actresses
21st-century Russian actresses
Actresses from Vilnius
Lithuanian film actresses
Russian film actresses
Lithuanian people of Russian descent
Russian people of Lithuanian descent